Alsu Renatovna Abdullina (born 11 April 2001) is a Russian footballer who plays as a left-back or wing-back for Chelsea in the FA Women's Super League and has appeared for the Russia women's national team.

Club career

Chelsea
In December 2021, Abdullina joined English club Chelsea, signing a two-and-a-half year deal until June 2024.

International career
Abdullina has been capped for the Russia national team, appearing for the team during the 2019 FIFA Women's World Cup qualifying cycle.

International goals

References

External links
 
 
 

2001 births
Living people
Russian women's footballers
Russia women's international footballers
Women's association football midfielders
FC Chertanovo Moscow (women) players
WFC Lokomotiv Moscow players
Chelsea F.C. Women players
People from Aznakayevsky District
Sportspeople from Tatarstan
21st-century Russian women